Vittorio Storaro is an Italian cinematographer, and member of the American Society of Cinematographers (ASC) and Italian Society of Cinematographers (AIC). Storaro's early films were made in his homeland of Italy, where he began early collaborations with Italian director Bernardo Bertolucci, with whom he has continued to collaborate with throughout his career. Storaro and Bertolucci's first major project was the 1970 film The Conformist, based on the Italian novel of the same name.

Storaro's first American film was Apocalypse Now, directed by Francis Ford Coppola. Storaro won an Academy Award for his work on the film, followed by two more Oscars for his work on Reds and The Last Emperor, and a nomination for Dick Tracy. Storaro also acted as cinematographer on films such as Last Tango in Paris, Ishtar, Bulworth, and Exorcist: The Beginning. In addition to Bertolucci and Coppola, Storaro has worked with directors such as Richard Donner, Warren Beatty, and Carlos Saura. Throughout his career, Storaro has been nominated for and won many awards for his work as a cinematographer, including a Lifetime Achievement Award from the American Society of Cinematographers.

Filmography

Awards and nominations

References 

 General

 
 
 . Note: User must define search parameters, i.e. "Vittorio Storaro."

 Specific

External links 
 

Storaro, Vittorio